Jiři Parma (born 9 January 1963) is a Czechoslovakian/Czech former ski jumper.

Career
At the 1992 Winter Olympics in Albertville, he won a bronze medal in the team large hill. Parma's biggest successes were at the FIS Nordic World Ski Championships, where he earned four medals. This included one gold (1987: Individual normal hill), one silver (1993: Team large hill), and two bronzes (1984, 1989: Team large hill).

He also had three individual career world cup wins (2 in 1984, and 1 in 1985).

World Cup

Standings

Wins

External links
 
 
 

1963 births
Living people
Czech male ski jumpers
Czechoslovak male ski jumpers
Ski jumpers at the 1984 Winter Olympics
Ski jumpers at the 1988 Winter Olympics
Ski jumpers at the 1992 Winter Olympics
Ski jumpers at the 1994 Winter Olympics
Olympic bronze medalists for Czechoslovakia
Olympic ski jumpers of Czechoslovakia
Olympic ski jumpers of the Czech Republic
Olympic medalists in ski jumping
FIS Nordic World Ski Championships medalists in ski jumping
Medalists at the 1992 Winter Olympics
People from Frenštát pod Radhoštěm
Sportspeople from the Moravian-Silesian Region